Lago Agrio Airport  is an airport serving Nueva Loja (also known as Lago Agrio), the capital of Sucumbíos Province in Ecuador.

The Lago Agrio VOR-DME (Ident: LAV) and non-directional beacon (Ident: LAR) are located on the field.

Airlines and destinations

See also

Transport in Ecuador
List of airports in Ecuador

References

External links 
OpenStreetMap - Lago Agrio
OurAirports - Lago Agrio
SkyVector - Lago Agrio
FallingRain - Lago Agrio Airport

Airports in Ecuador
Buildings and structures in Sucumbíos Province